Thouless may refer to:

People
David J. Thouless (1934–2019), British-American physicist, member of the U.S. National Academy of Sciences and 2016 recipient of the Nobel Prize in Physics
Robert H. Thouless (1894–1984), British psychologist and parapsychologist, author of Straight and Crooked Thinking

Other uses
Thouless energy
Kosterlitz-Thouless transition

See also 
 Thewlis
 Thewliss
 David Thewlis 
 Alison Thewliss
 Michael Thewlis